In quantum chromodynamics (QCD), Brown–Rho (BR) scaling is an approximate scaling law for hadrons in an ultra-hot, ultra-dense medium, such as hadrons in the quark epoch during the first microsecond of the Big Bang or within neutron stars.

According to Gerald E. Brown and Mannque Rho in their 1991 publication in Physical Review Letters:

 refers to the pole mass of the ρ meson, whereas  refers to the in-medium mass (or running mass in the medium) of the ρ meson according to QCD sum rules. The omega meson, sigma meson, and neutron are denoted by
ω, σ, and N, respectively. The symbol  denotes the free-space pion decay constant. (Decay constants have a "running time" and a "pole time" similar to the "running mass" and "pole mass" concepts, according to special relativity.) The symbol  is also used to denote the pion decay constant.

The hypothesis of Brown–Rho scaling is supported by experimental evidence on beta decay of 14C to the 14N ground state.

See also
Quantum chromodynamics
QCD matter
Pion decay constant

References

Quantum chromodynamics